The 2002–03 Divizia B was the 63rd season of the second tier of the Romanian football league system.

The format has been maintained to two series, each of them having 16 teams. At the end of the season, the winners of the series promoted to Divizia A and the last two places from both series relegated to Divizia C. A promotion play-off was played between the 13th and 14th-placed in the Divizia A and the runners-up of the Divizia B series.

Team changes

To Divizia B
Promoted from Divizia C
 Politehnica Unirea Iași
 Gloria Buzău
 Medgidia
 Rulmentul Alexandria
 Gilortul Târgu Cărbunești
 Corvinul Hunedoara
 CFR Cluj
 Bucovina Suceava**

Relegated from Divizia A
 Petrolul Ploiești
 UM Timișoara

From Divizia B
Relegated to Divizia C
 Tractorul Brașov
 Dinamo Poiana Câmpina
 Petrolul Moinești
 ASA Târgu Mureș
 Laminorul Roman
 Jiul Petroșani
 Rocar București
 Politehnica Timișoara**

Promoted to Divizia A
 AEK București**
 UTA Arad

Other
AEK București merged with Politehnica Timișoara and was absorbed. Politehnica played directly in the first tier, instead of third and also was renamed as Politehnica AEK Timișoara.

Bucovina Suceava break the alliance with Foresta Fălticeni, bought the place from Tractorul Brașov and was enrolled directly in the second tier.

Olimpia Satu Mare bought the place of Metrom Brașov, which chose to sell it again, instead of playing at the second level.

Renamed teams
Diplomatic Focșani was renamed as Unirea Focșani.

Foresta Suceava was moved back from Suceava to Fălticeni and renamed as Foresta Fălticeni.

Politehnica Unirea Iași was renamed as Politehnica Iași.

FC Bihor Oradea was renamed as FC Oradea.

League tables

Seria I

Seria II

Divizia A play-off
The 13th and 14th-placed teams of the Divizia A faced the 2nd-placed teams of the Divizia B.

|}

Top scorers 
14 goals
  Dan Codreanu (Universitatea Cluj)

12 goals
  Ovidiu Maier (Apulum Alba Iulia)
  Cătălin Bozdog (Olimpia Satu Mare)

10 goals
  Zoltán Csehi (FC Oradea)

9 goals
  George Florescu (Universitatea Cluj)
  Cosmin Tilincă (CFR Cluj)

8 goals

  Tudorel Stanciu (Unirea Focșani)
  Bogdan Vrăjitoarea (FC Oradea)
  Daniel Stan (Internațional Pitești)

7 goals

  Sorin Oncică (CFR Cluj)
  Claudiu Boaru (Gaz Metan Mediaș)

See also 

 2002–03 Divizia A
 2002–03 Divizia C
 2002–03 Divizia D

References 

Liga II seasons
Rom
2002–03 in Romanian football